Jefferson Airplane is the eighth and final studio album by San Francisco rock band Jefferson Airplane, released on Epic Records in 1989. Marty Balin, Paul Kantner, Grace Slick, Jorma Kaukonen and Jack Casady all returned for the album and supporting tour, though Spencer Dryden did not participate. The album and accompanying tour would mark the last time Jefferson Airplane would perform together until their 1996 induction to the Rock and Roll Hall of Fame.

Overview
Paul Kantner, Marty Balin, and Jack Casady had toured as the KBC Band and released an eponymous album in 1986. Grace Slick had recently left Starship after performing lead vocals on their album No Protection in 1987, and planned to retire from music. Jorma Kaukonen had been performing solo work and performing live with Jack Casady as Hot Tuna. Kantner left KBC Band in 1987 but joined Hot Tuna on stage for the 1987–1988 tour. Kaukonen invited Slick to play a concert at the Fillmore with Hot Tuna in 1988 where she performed harmony vocals on "Third Week in the Chelsea" and lead vocals along with Kantner for "Wooden Ships". In 1989, Slick was convinced to join the band again and the five members finally got together to discuss a reunion tour and album. Joining Jefferson Airplane for the tour along with Kenny Aronoff on drums were Tim Gorman – who had played with KBC Band – on keyboards, Randy Jackson on guitar, and Jorma's brother Peter Kaukonen also on guitar. Gorman and Jackson did not participate on the album. Aronoff joined the band as drummer for the tour and in the studio. The album was produced by Ron Nevison, who had previously produced the Jefferson Starship albums Freedom at Point Zero, Modern Times and Nuclear Furniture, as well as Slick's solo album Software. Kaukonen was displeased with Kantner and Slick's methods in the studio; "Their approach to recording was not the way we used to do it in the old days. It was very much the modular, sequenced LA way of recording. It works for some people but not me. It just wasn't even fun. It was well done but not very passionate."

The first music video made to promote the album was for the Kantner-penned "Planes". The video helped the single rise to #24 on the Billboard charts for mainstream rock, although the album itself only rose to #85 on the Billboard 200. "Planes" had previously been performed live by KBC Band, and the first studio version was made for this album. Balin's song "Summer of Love" had also been performed live with KBC Band, and was first recorded in the studio for this album. The song did not have a music video but rose to #15 on the adult contemporary charts. Steve Porcaro and David Paich of Toto wrote the final single, "True Love", and also appeared on the song along with bandmate Mike Porcaro. The music video for "True Love" saw less airtime than the video for "Planes". The Kaukonen compositions "Ice Age" and "Too Many Years" had previously been recorded in acoustic versions for the Kaukonen solo album Too Hot to Handle, and received a multi-instrumental treatment here. Kaukonen wrote one more song for the album, the instrumental "Upfront Blues." At least two songs were written but rejected for the album: Balin's "Let's Go" and Slick's "Harbor in Hong Kong".

After the album was released, Hot Tuna signed to Epic and released Pair a Dice Found—their first studio album in fourteen years.

Track listing

Personnel
Jefferson Airplane
 Grace Slick – vocals, keyboards
 Paul Kantner – vocals, guitars
Marty Balin – vocals
Jack Casady – bass
 Jorma Kaukonen – vocals, guitars

Additional personnel
 Kenny Aronoff – drums, percussion
 David Paich – keyboards
 Michael Landau – guitars
 Nicky Hopkins – keyboards
 Flo & Eddie – background vocals
 Charles Judge – keyboards
 Efrain Toro – percussion
 Peter Kaukonen – guitars
 Mike Porcaro – bass
 Steve Porcaro – keyboard programming

Production
Ron Nevison – producer, engineer, mixer
Greg Edward – producer, engineer, mixer
Jefferson Airplane – producer
Recorded at The Record Plant, Los Angeles
Jim Mitchell & Rumbo Recorders, Los Angeles – assistant engineer
Gina Immel – assistant engineer
Mixed at Can-Am Recorders, Los Angeles
Toby Wright – assistant mixer
Trudy Green – management
Lynda Lou Bouch – production coordinator
Paul Jamieson – drum technician
Don Barlow – guitar technician
Billy Goodman - equipment mganager/tour
John Danaher - keyboard technician/tour
Pre-Production: The Power Plant
Carl Studna – photography

Charts
Album 

Singles

Singles
"Summer of Love" (1989) (single only, no video)
"Planes" (1989)
"True Love" (1989)

Notes

References

1989 albums
Albums produced by Ron Nevison
Albums recorded at Record Plant (Los Angeles)
Epic Records albums
Jefferson Airplane albums